Church of the Madalene was established as a parish in the Roman Catholic Diocese of Tulsa in 1946. It is located at 22nd and Harvard in mid-town in the city of Tulsa in the state of Oklahoma.

The parish motto is A Roman Catholic community of faith serving the Lord in word and deed..

Clergy
 Fr. Desmond Okpogba
 Deacon Nelson Sousa
 Deacon Robert DeWeese (retired)
 Deacon Larry McFadden (retired)

Staff
 June Benton (Business Manager)
 Anne Edwards (Pastoral Care)
 Becky Holder (Director of Youth Formation) 
 Jennifer Merle (Parish Life Coordinator)

See also
 Roman Catholic Diocese of Tulsa
 Bishop Edward James Slattery

External links
 Church of the Madalene Home Page.

Churches in the Roman Catholic Diocese of Tulsa
Roman Catholic churches in Oklahoma
Churches in Tulsa, Oklahoma